The fifth season of MTV's reality dating series Are You the One? premiered on January 11, 2017.

This season featured 2 big changes. When a couple gets sent into the truth booth to see if they are a perfect match, the rest of the house can either vote to see if they are a perfect match, or earn $150,000, and not see the result of the couple. This only will pertain to certain weeks. Also, if the house blacks out at a match-up ceremony, their money will decrease by 50% each time instead of $250,000.

Cast

Progress 

Notes

 Unconfirmed Perfect Match  Confirmed Not A Match (correct Matching is in parentheses).

Due to the blackout in Episode 2, the whole cast lost $500,000, lowering the total money at the end to $500,000 instead of $1,000,000.

In Episode 9, the cast decided to take the trade offer instead of finding out if Derrick and Tyranny were a perfect match, which increased the total money at stake to $650,000

In Episode 10, the cast decided to take the trade offer instead of finding out if Joey and Casandra were a perfect match, which increased the total money at stake to $800,000

In Episode 10, the cast did not find all their perfect matches, winning no money at the end.

After the reunion, final Perfect Matches were revealed as the following:

Truth Booths

Note: In Episode 9, the cast decided to take the $150,000 trade instead of finding out if Derrick and Tyranny were a match.

Note: In Episode 10, the cast decided to take the $150,000 trade instead of finding out if Joey and Casandra were a match.

Episodes

After filming 
Derrick Henry & Casandra Martinez, Hayden Weaver & Carolina Duarte and Mike Cerasani & Alicia Wright returned for Are You The One?: Second Chances.

Alicia Wright, Andre Siemens, Derrick Henry, and Taylor Selfridge appeared on the first season of Ex on the Beach. Shannon Duffy appeared on the third season. Tyranny Todd appeared on the fourth season.

On April 22, 2020, Selfridge and her Ex on the Beach costar Cory Wharton welcomed their first daughter, Mila Mae. A Teen Mom OG special episode was planned for the occasion, but was pulled off the air after some 2012 racially insensitive tweets from Selfridge resurfaced online. On June 1, 2022, Selfridge gave birth to the couple's second daughter, Maya Grace.

On May 17, 2022, Kam Williams and former The Challenge castmate Leroy Garrett welcomed son Kingston Lee.

Sexual assault allegations 

In April 2021, cast member Gianna Hammer alleged that one night while filming in 2016 she was drugged by production, and then later sexually assaulted by a male cast member whose name she requested be withheld. Hammer was on the prescription drug Zoloft during filming, which she usually took in the morning. Prior to the incident, while extremely intoxicated, she was in an argument with another cast member. Lighthearted Entertainment producers pulled her aside and gave her a second dosage of Zoloft "to calm her down". Other cast members witnessed her telling producers that she was not supposed to take the drug while drinking, something her doctors advised her about. She ended up taking it after producers convinced her by saying it wasn't a high enough dosage. The assault occurred later that night while cast members were in bed, and she ended up sharing a bed with a male cast member. Other cast members had to stop the assault from happening after hearing her say "no" and "stop". In the morning, Hammer was told by production what had occurred, and then asked if she wanted the male cast member kicked off the show. In response to Hammer's questions about the producer's thoughts, she alleged they made comments such as "He flew all the way out here, we did all this testing for him, he has a perfect match in this house ... he’d have to spend the rest of the time in a hotel by himself". Hammer said she wasn't sure how to answer and said she didn't want to be reason he got kicked off the show, which producers took as a sign that she was okay with him staying in the house. Afterward, the male cast member was no longer allowed to sleep in the bedroom the other cast members used, and slept on the couch the rest of filming. Both the male cast member and Hammer were cut off from booze for the rest of the show which Hammer felt was a punishment for her. The Daily Beast, who first reported the story, says they spoke on the record to five other cast members of the season who all confirmed parts of Hammer's story.

Following filming, Hammer says she felt "disrespected" after she was never contacted by anyone from Lighthearted Entertainment production or MTV about the assault. Fellow castmate Hayden Weaver emailed their MTV representative Lauren Zins alerting her to Hammer's assault and questioning the situation, to which Zins replied via email with "I am not a magician, I can't erase the past..." Since the story was released, MTV has taken the season off of streaming platforms and stated they "take these issues very seriously and have paused production/casting to conduct an independent investigation into the allegations, the third party production company and further review our internal safety protocols." Lighthearted Entertainment has denied these allegations, and claimed that "Throughout the eight seasons of the show, no contestant has reported an incident of sexual assault to Lighthearted." They also state they plan to cooperate with full transparency with any investigation.

The Challenge 

Challenge in bold indicates that the contestant was a finalist on The Challenge.

References

Are You the One?
2017 American television seasons